The Georgetown Hoyas softball team represents Georgetown University in NCAA Division I college softball.  The team participates in the Big East Conference. In 2021, the team is led by head coach Pat Conlan and assistant coach Monique White. The team plays its home games at Washington Nationals Youth Academy.  The team was established in 2006, and played as an independent for three seasons before joining the Big East in 2009.

See also
List of NCAA Division I softball programs

References